Trachylepis makolowodei, also known commonly as Makolowode's skink and Makolowodes's trachylepis, is a species of lizard in the family Scincidae. The species is indigenous to Central Africa.

Etymology
The specific name, makolowodei, is in honor of Central African herpetologist Paul Makolowode.

Geographic range
T. makolowodei is found in Cameroon and Central African Republic.

Reproduction
The mode of reproduction of T. makolowodei is unknown.

References

Further reading
Chirio L, Ineich I, Schmitz A, LeBreton M (2008). "A new species of Trachylepis Fitzinger, 1843 (Squamata: Scincidae) from central African forests". African Journal of Herpetology 57 (1): 13–28. (Trachylepis makolowodei, new species). (in English, with an abstract in French).
Gvoždík V, Dolinay M, Zassi-Boulou A, Babangenge GB (2018). "New data on Trachylepis makolowodei from Central Africa". Herpetology Notes 11: 515–518.

Trachylepis
Reptiles described in 2008
Taxa named by Laurent Chirio
Taxa named by Ivan Ineich
Taxa named by Andreas Schmitz
Taxa named by Matthew Lebreton